Damn (stylized as DAMN.) is the fourth studio album by American rapper Kendrick Lamar. It was released on April 14, 2017, through Top Dawg Entertainment, Aftermath Entertainment and Interscope Records. Lamar assembled numerous artists and producers to produce the album, including executive producer and Top Dawg Entertainment label-head Anthony "Top Dawg" Tiffith, Sounwave, DJ Dahi, Mike Will Made It, and Ricci Riera, as well as further production contributions from James Blake, Steve Lacy, BadBadNotGood, Greg Kurstin, The Alchemist, and 9th Wonder, among others. The album features guest vocals from singer Rihanna and Top Dawg singer Zacari, along with Irish rock band U2.

The album has been categorized as conscious hip hop, a genre Lamar incorporated on his previous studio album, To Pimp a Butterfly. The album also incorporates elements of trap, contemporary R&B, and pop. Prior to the album's release, Lamar released a promotional single, "The Heart Part 4". In the months that followed, Lamar released three singles from the album; "Humble" was released in March 2017, "Loyalty" in June 2017, and "Love" in October 2017, the first of which became Lamar's first number-one single on the US Billboard Hot 100 as a lead artist.

Damn received widespread critical acclaim, with many naming the album one of the best albums of 2017 and the decade. The album became the first non-jazz or classical work to earn a Pulitzer Prize for Music and won Best Rap Album at the 2018 Grammy Awards, as well receiving a nomination for Album of the Year at the ceremony. The album topped the US Billboard 200 with 603,000 album-equivalent units earned in its first week and topped the chart of Canada while reaching number two in Australia, Belgium, Denmark, Ireland, the Netherlands, Norway, Sweden, and the United Kingdom. It has since been certified triple platinum by the Recording Industry Association of America (RIAA) in May 2018 and was the Billboard Year-End number one album of 2017. In 2020, the album was ranked 175th on Rolling Stones updated list of the 500 Greatest Albums of All Time.

Recording and production
The beat for "Humble" was developed by Mike Will with the intention of recording with Gucci Mane, but later showed it to Kendrick Lamar. After recording, it was initially agreed upon that it would be released on Mike Will's debut album Ransom 2, but others convinced Lamar to keep it for his own next album.

"DNA" was the second song from the album to be recorded by Lamar and Mike Will, after "Humble". After the first verse of "DNA" was recorded with the beat that Mike Will had already prepared, Lamar started rapping the second verse a cappella, requesting that Mike Will build the beat around the rap. Lamar proposed that it sound like "chaos", and Mike Will put together the second half of the song with the intention to make it "sound like he's battling the beat".

Lamar has said in interviews that the ability to play the album in reverse tracklist order was "premeditated ... in the studio": "It plays as a full story and even a better rhythm. It's one of my favorite rhythms and tempos within the album".

Musical style
Damn has been characterized as conscious rap with elements of trap, R&B and pop.

Artwork and title
On April 11, 2017, Lamar revealed the cover artwork for Damn. The album cover was designed by Vlad Sepetov, who created the album covers for Lamar's last two projects – To Pimp a Butterfly and Untitled Unmastered. Sepetov described Damns cover as "loud and abrasive" and "not uber political like To Pimp a Butterfly but it has energy". Sepetov goes on to say the decision to put the Parental Advisory sticker in its unconventional position was so it could be a part of the design instead of an "afterthought". Billboard listed the cover as one of the best of 2017, dubbing it "both meme-able and memorable".

In a radio interview on June 29, 2017, Lamar revealed the original title for the album was going to be What Happens on Earth Stays on Earth, but eventually settled on Damn. He stated the working title "didn't read right". Lamar went on to say about its final title, "There was so many different ways you could put it in my head. Damned if I do, damned if I don't. The loudness of the record. When I think about "DNA", when I think of "Humble", when I think these records, it just felt like that."

Release and promotion

On March 23, 2017, Lamar released a promotional single, "The Heart Part 4", which contained lyrics hinting at a possible April 7 release date for his fourth studio album. On April 7, 2017, the album was made available for pre-order and confirmed to be released on April 14. On April 11, Lamar revealed the track listing for Damn.

On December 8, 2017, Lamar released the Collectors Edition of the album. The album is the same musically, but has a reversed track order and new artwork.

Singles
On March 30, 2017, Lamar released the album's lead single, "Humble", accompanied by a music video. It reached number one on the US Billboard Hot 100 and number two on the Canadian Hot 100 chart. "Loyalty" featuring Rihanna, was released as the album's second single on June 20, 2017, to rhythmic and urban contemporary radio. The song peaked at number 14 on the Billboard Hot 100. "Love" featuring Zacari, was released as the album's third single on October 2, 2017, to rhythmic contemporary radio. It was released to contemporary hit radio on November 21, 2017. The song peaked at number 11 on the Billboard Hot 100.

Other songs
The music video for the song, "DNA", was released on April 18, 2017. The song entered at number four on the Billboard Hot 100, becoming Lamar's second highest-charting song as a solo artist after "Humble".

The music video for the song, "Element", was released on June 27, 2017. The song peaked at number 16 on the Billboard Hot 100.

Critical reception

Damn was met with widespread critical acclaim. At Metacritic, which assigns a normalized rating out of 100 to reviews from professional publications, the album received an average score of 95, based on 39 reviews. Aggregator AnyDecentMusic? gave it 9.1 out of 10, based on their assessment of the critical consensus.

Andy Kellman of AllMusic stated that "it contains some of Lamar's best writing and performances, revealing his evolving complexity and versatility as a soul-baring lyricist and dynamic rapper". Christopher R. Weingarten, an author for Rolling Stone, said, "Much like the recent A Tribe Called Quest record, Damn. is a brilliant combination of the timeless and the modern, the old school and the next-level. The most gifted rapper of a generation stomps into the Nineties and continues to blaze a trail forward". In his review, Greg Kot of the Chicago Tribune states, "Damn. strips down the rhythms to their essence, flavored with the occasional cameo (notably Rihanna and U2). Lamar's voice does most of the heavy lifting, playing multiple roles and characters. His supple singing complements a variety of rap tones and textures". Jon Caramanica of The New York Times gave a positive review, stating "Tart and punchy. ... Sometimes boisterous, sometimes swampy, rarely fanciful album—it's Mr. Lamar's version of the creeping paranoia that has become de rigueur for midcareer Drake. And yet this is likely Mr. Lamar's most jubilant album, the one in which his rhymes are the least tangled". Eric Renner Brown of Entertainment Weekly said, "After delving into the personal on 2012's Good Kid, M.A.A.D City and going broader on Butterfly, Lamar has found a middle ground on Damn. that yields some of his most emotionally resonant music yet".

Alexis Petridis of The Guardian wrote: "If it seems a more straightforward listen than To Pimp a Butterfly, there's a cheering sense that this doesn't equate to a lessening of musical ambition. There's none of that album's wilfully jarring quality – its sudden, anxious musical lurches and abrupt, short-circuiting leaps between genres – but the tracks on Damn still feel episodic and expansive. Whether Damn will have the same epochal impact as To Pimp a Butterfly remains to be seen, but either way it sounds like the work of a supremely confident artist at the top of his game." Neil McCormick of The Daily Telegraph stating that Damn "is the work of a future all-time great in full command of his powers". Leonie Cooper of NME said, "Damn. is by far his shortest release to date – but the ideas, thoughts and feelings it contains are massive, weighty things, from sexual tension to deep, dark depression". In Pitchforks review of Damn, Matthew Trammell writes Damn "is a widescreen masterpiece of rap, full of expensive beats, furious rhymes, and peerless storytelling about Kendrick's destiny in America". Writing for The A.V. Club, Evan Rytlewski concluded, "Lamar trusts every idea to stand on its own. When you're making art this substantial, vital, and virtuosic, there's no need to wrap a tidy bow around it". In a mixed review, A. Harmony of Exclaim! wrote that Damn "is the first time in Lamar's career that he hasn't broken new ground, explored old themes in new ways or exhibited sonic growth".

Rankings

Industry awards

Commercial performance
In the United States, Damn debuted at number one on the Billboard 200 with 603,000 album-equivalent units in its first week of release, becoming his third consecutive album after To Pimp a Butterfly (2015) and Untitled Unmastered (2016) to reach the nation's summit. It sold 353,000 copies in its first week and accumulated over 340 million streams. In its second week, the album remained at the top of the US charts with 238,000 album-equivalent units of which 87,000 were traditional album sales, bringing the sales to a total of 841,000 units. In its third week, the album continued to top the charts with 173,000 album-equivalent units of which 57,000 were traditional album sales, bringing the sales to a total of 1.014 million units. As of April 2018, Damn had sold 1,002,000 copies and earned 3,137,000 album-equivalent units in the US.

On May 10, 2018, the album was certified triple platinum by the Recording Industry Association of America (RIAA) for combined sales, streaming and track-sales equivalent of three million units. The album also opened atop the Canadian Albums Chart with 35,000 consumption units and 25.4 million streams, becoming the rapper's third consecutive album to arrive at number one. In the United Kingdom, Damn sold 30,000 units in its first week and entered at number two on the UK Albums Chart.

According to IFPI, it was the seventh best selling album of 2017, with 1.3 million copies shipped globally. Damn was ranked as the number one album of the year on the Billboard 200 in 2017. In 2018, Damn was ranked as the thirteenth most popular album of the year on the Billboard 200.

Track listing

Notes
  signifies an additional producer
  signifies an uncredited co-producer
  signifies a vocal producer
 Every song is stylized in all capital letters, with a period at the end of their titles, including featured artist credits. For example, "Loyalty" is stylized as "LOYALTY. FEAT. RIHANNA."
 Some CD pressings of the album have slight differences: "Pride" runs for 4 minutes and 31 seconds (4:31), "Love" runs for 3 minutes and 31 seconds (3:31), and "Fear" runs for 6 minutes and 54 seconds (6:54), bringing the total album length to 54 minutes and 2 seconds (54:02). This version of the album also features slightly different mixing.

Sample credits
 "Blood" and "DNA" contain elements of Fox News commentators Eric Bolling, Kimberly Guilfoyle and Geraldo Rivera criticizing Lamar's 2015 BET Awards performance.
 "Feel" contains a sample of "Stormy", written and performed by O. C. Smith; and an interpolation from "Don't Let Me Down", written and performed by Fleurie.
 "Loyalty" contains samples of "24K Magic", written by Bruno Mars, Christopher Brody Brown and Philip Lawrence, as performed by Bruno Mars; "Shimmy Shimmy Ya", written by Russell Jones and Robert Diggs, as performed by Ol' Dirty Bastard; and "Get Your Mind Right Mami", written by Shawn Carter, Cordozar Calvin Broadus, Jr., Malik Cox and Ricardo Thomas, as performed by Jay-Z featuring Snoop Dogg and Memphis Bleek.
 "Fear" contains a sample of "Poverty's Paradise", written by Dale Warren and performed by 24-Carat Black.
 "God" contains a sample of "End of the World", written and performed by Illmind.
 "Duckworth" contains samples of "Atari", written by Nai Palm and performed by Hiatus Kaiyote; "Be Ever Wonderful", written by Don Robey and Joe Scott, as performed by Ted Taylor; "Ostavi Trag", written by September; and "Let the Drums Speak", written by Bill Curtis and performed by the Fatback Band.

Personnel
Adapted from the album liner notes and AllMusic.

Production and music
 9th Wonder – production ("Duckworth")
 Anna Wise – additional vocals ("Pride")
 Alan "The Alchemist" Maman – producer ("Fear")
 Bekon – additional vocals ("Blood", "Yah", "Pride", "XXX", "Fear", "God", "Duckworth")
 Carl Duckworth – additional vocals ("Fear")
 Charles Edward Sydney Isom Jr. – additional vocals ("Fear")
 Chelsea Blythe – additional vocals ("Feel")
 DJ Dahi – additional vocals ("Loyalty")
 Dave Free – associate producer
 Dr. Dre – executive producer
 Kam Sangha – production
 Kamasi Washington – strings ("Lust")
 Kaytranada – additional vocals ("Lust")
 Kendrick Lamar – vocals; additional keys ("XXX")
 Kid Capri – additional vocals ("Element", "Love", "XXX", "Duckworth")
 Kuk Harrell – vocal production for Rihanna
 Matt Schaeffer – guitar ("Humble"); additional guitar ("DNA", "Feel")
 Mike Hector – additional drums ("God")
 Rat Boy – additional vocals ("Lust")
 Steve Lacy – background vocals, production ("Pride")
 Thundercat – bass ("Feel")
Technical
 Blake Harden – recording ("Lust", "Duckworth") at Windmark Studios
 Brendan Silas Perry – additional recording ("Element", "Love", "Duckworth")
 Cyrus Taghipour – mix assistant
 Derek "MixedByAli" Ali – mixing
 James Hunt – engineer, mixing ("Element")
 Marcos Tovar – vocal recording for Rihanna (at Windmark Studios)
 Matt Schaeffer – engineer ("Humble"); mixing ("Element")
 Mike Bozzi – mastering at Bernie Grundman in Hollywood, California
 Sounwave – mixing ("Feel")
 Tyler Page – mix assistant
 Zeke Mishanec – additional recording ("Element", "Love", "Duckworth")
Art
 Dave Free – creative direction, photography
 Kendrick Lamar – creative direction
 Roberto Reyes – photography
 Vladimir Sepetov – creative direction

Charts

Weekly charts

Year-end charts

Decade-end charts

Certifications

Release history

See also
 List of Billboard 200 number-one albums of 2017
 List of number-one albums of 2017 (Canada)

References

2017 albums
Kendrick Lamar albums
Top Dawg Entertainment albums
Aftermath Entertainment albums
Interscope Records albums
Albums produced by 9th Wonder
Albums produced by Cardo
Albums produced by DJ Dahi
Albums produced by Mike Will Made It
Albums produced by Terrace Martin
Albums produced by Dr. Dre
Albums produced by BadBadNotGood
Albums produced by the Alchemist (musician)
Albums produced by Steve Lacy
Albums produced by Sounwave
Albums produced by Tae Beast
Albums produced by James Blake (musician)
Concept albums
Grammy Award for Best Rap Album
Juno Award for International Album of the Year albums
Pulitzer Prize for Music-winning works
Albums produced by Greg Kurstin
Surprise albums